Herbert Roper Barrett defeated Charles Dixon 5–7, 4–6, 6–4, 6–3, 6–1 in the All Comers' Final, but the reigning champion Anthony Wilding defeated Roper Barrett 6–4, 4-6, 2–6, 6–2 retired in the challenge round to win the gentlemen's singles tennis title at the 1911 Wimbledon Championships.

Draw

Challenge round

All comers' finals

Top half

Section 1

Section 2

The nationality of A Popp is unknown.

Section 3

Section 4

Bottom half

Section 5

Section 6

Section 7

Section 8

References

External links

Men's Singles
Wimbledon Championship by year – Men's singles